Demetrius II the Self-Sacrificer or the Devoted (1259–12 March 1289) of the Bagrationi dynasty, was king of Georgia in 1270–1289.

Life

Son of King David VII and his wife Gvantsa, Demetrius was only 2 years old when his mother was killed by the Mongols in 1261. He succeeded on his father's death in 1270, when he was 11 years old. He ruled under the regency of Sadun Mankaberdeli for some time. In 1277–1281, he took part in Abaqa Khan's campaigns against Egypt and in particularly distinguished himself at the Second Battle of Homs, (29 October 1281).  Although he continued to be titled "king of Georgians and Abkhazians, etc", Demetrius's rule extended only over the eastern part of the kingdom. Western Georgia was under the rule of the Imeretian branch of the Bagrationi dynasty.

King Demetrius was considered quite a controversial person. Devoted to Christianity, he was criticized for his polygamy. In 1288, on the order of Arghun Khan, he subdued the rebel province of Derbend at the Caspian Sea. The same year, Arghun revealed a plot organized by his powerful minister Buqa, whose son was married to Demetrius's daughter. Bugha and his family were massacred, and the Georgian king, suspected to be involved in a plot, was ordered to the Mongol capital, or Arghun threatened to invade Georgia. Despite much advice from nobles, Demetrius headed for the Khan's residence to face apparent death, and was imprisoned there. He was beheaded at Movakan on 12 March 1289. He was buried at Mtskheta, Georgia, and canonized by the Georgian Orthodox Church.

He was succeeded by his cousin Vakhtang II.

Marriages and children

At one point, Demetrius had three wives. In 1277, he married a daughter of Manuel I of Trebizond by whom he had five children

 David VIII
 Vakhtang III
 Prince Lasha
 Prince Manuel 
 Princess Rusudan

Demetrius also had three children by his second wife, Mongol princess Solghar:

 Prince Baidu 
 Prince Iadgar
 Princess Jigda, married Emperor Alexios II of Trebizond

In ca. 1280, he married his third wife, Natela, daughter of Beka I Jaqeli, Atabeg of Samtskhe and Lord High Steward of Georgia. They were the parents of:
 George V the Brilliant.

References 

 George Finlay, The History of Greece and the Empire of Trebizond, (1204-1461) (Edinburgh: William Blackwood, 1851), p. 436 [wrong reference - the page number does not contain information about Jigda Khanun]

External links

 დემეტრე II თავდადებული (in Georgian)

Kings of Georgia
People executed by Mongolia by decapitation
Medieval child monarchs
13th-century people from Georgia (country)
1259 births
1289 deaths
Executed people from Georgia (country)
People executed by the Mongol Empire
13th-century executions
Eastern Orthodox monarchs
Eastern Orthodox Christians from Georgia (country)
Bagrationi dynasty of the Kingdom of Georgia